Susan Concannon (born July 23, 1958) is an American politician who has served in the Kansas House of Representatives from the 107th district since 2013.

References

External links
Vote Smart Susan Concannon

1958 births
Living people
Republican Party members of the Kansas House of Representatives
21st-century American politicians
Bethany College (Kansas) alumni